Berk (also: Berkköy) is a village in the Bolu District of Bolu Province, Turkey. Its population is 684 (2021).

According to village website, the village was named after a Turkmen tribe and was mentioned in the Ottoman Empire documents of 1533. The village economy depends on farming. Legumes and other vegetables are the main crops.

References

Villages in Bolu District